Daryl Campbell (born May 29, 1986) is an American politician. He served as a Democratic member for the 94th district of the Florida House of Representatives.

Born in New Rochelle, New York. Campbell attended at the Jacksonville University, where he earned his bachelor's degree based on sociology in 2010. He then attended at the Barry University, where he earned his master's degree in 2017. Campbell settled in Fort Lauderdale, Florida. In 2022, he won the election for the 94th district of the Florida House of Representatives, in which Campbell was against Josephus Eggelletion III, Elijah Manley and Rod Kemp. He succeeded Bobby DuBose. Campbell assumed his office on January 31, 2022.

According to the South Florida Sun Sentinel and South Florida Gay News, Campbell faced substanial allegations of homophobia against his gay opponent Elijah Manley in the 2022 Election. Campbell denied the allegations in an op-ed, and decisively won the election shortly after.

References 

1986 births
Living people
People from New Rochelle, New York
Politicians from New Rochelle, New York
Democratic Party members of the Florida House of Representatives
21st-century American politicians
21st-century African-American politicians
20th-century African-American people
Jacksonville University alumni
Barry University alumni